Patarcocha is the name of two lakes in Peru:

 Lake Patarcocha, Huánuco Region
 Patarcocha (Ancash), Ancash Region